"You Can't Put Your Arms Around a Memory" is a song released in 1978 by Johnny Thunders. The title was taken from a line in the "Better Living Through TV" episode of the sitcom The Honeymooners. It is considered by many to be his signature song.

The ballad has been interpreted to be about Thunders' heroin addiction, and about his romance with Sable Starr. However, according to Nina Antonia's biography, Johnny Thunders...In Cold Blood, the song was written before he was even a member of the New York Dolls, and years before he ever tried heroin.

Covers 
 Guns N' Roses covered the song on their album, "The Spaghetti Incident?". All the instruments on this version were performed by Duff McKagan.
 Billie Joe Armstrong of Green Day covered the song on the album No Fun Mondays.
 Ronnie Spector (featuring Joey Ramone) covered the song on her album The Last of the Rock Stars.
 The song appears in the documentary about Thunders's New York Dolls bandmate Arthur Kane, New York Doll.
•The Bruisers covered it under 
the name "Ode To Johnny" on 
their 1997 cd ep "Still 
Standing Up".

References 

1978 singles
Johnny Thunders songs
Guns N' Roses songs
Manic Street Preachers songs
Songs written by Johnny Thunders
1978 songs